José Carlos Castillo (born 18 February 1992) is a Guatemalan football forward who plays for Chiapas in the Liga MX.

Career
Castillo started his football career in the Athletics team of the Centro Escolar El Roble. He joined than in the 2009 season to Juventud Saleciana and earned his first senior caps.

Nicknamed "Harry Potter", Castillo played collegiate soccer at Virginia Commonwealth University before joining the Chiapas under-20 side in June 2012.

International 
Castillo has played for Guatemala at various youth levels, appearing for the Guatemala national under-17 football team at the Premundial Sub 17 2008 in Mexico. He played also with the Guatemala national under-20 football team at the 2011 FIFA U-20 World Cup finals in Colombia.

References

External links

1992 births
Living people
Guatemalan footballers
Guatemala international footballers
VCU Rams men's soccer players
Chiapas F.C. footballers
Association football midfielders

it:José Castillo